John Tucker (born around 1800) was the victim of a racial terror lynching that took place on July 4, 1845, in downtown Indianapolis, Indiana. Tucker was a free Black man, a husband and a father, who was working as a farmer at the time of his death. Tucker was attacked and killed by three drunken white men in front of a crowd. Two of the men were arrested for Tucker's murder, but only one was convicted.

Life 
In his early life, John Tucker was enslaved in Kentucky. Tucker obtained his freedom and relocated to Indianapolis. At the time of his death, he and his wife were the parents of two young children, Mary and William. The family lived "in a house near the intersection of St. Clair and Delaware Streets" in downtown Indianapolis. Tucker worked as a farmer for City Postmaster Samuel Henderson.

Lynching 
On the afternoon of July 4, 1845, John Tucker was lynched in downtown Indianapolis. Finding himself being accosted by a drunken white man, Nicholas Wood, Tucker began to walk toward the Indianapolis Magistrate's office to seek help. But Wood was soon joined by two other white men, William Ballenger (a saloon owner) and Edward Davis. According to the Indiana State Sentinel, an Indiana newspaper that covered the lynching, the assailants attacked Tucker with clubs, stones, and brickbats. The minister of Second Presbyterian Church, located very near the site of Tucker's death, Reverend Henry Ward Beecher, wrote that Tucker "defended himself with desperate determination" during the attack. While a few people attempted to "separate Tucker from his assaulters," a large crowd gathered who cheered for Tucker's death. Those involved continued to beat Tucker after he was already dead.

Aftermath: trials and impact 
Two of the three men who committed this crime, Nicholas Wood and Edward Davis, were arrested and tried for John Tucker's murder. The third man, William Ballenger, was never apprehended. Nicholas Wood was found guilty, but a jury acquitted Edward Davis. The Sentinel "speculated on the reasoning for the differing verdicts, noting Wood was found guilty because he 'commenced the affray, and followed it up to its conclusion.'” Wood was convicted of manslaughter and received three years of hard labor. It was rare for a white person to be tried, let alone, convicted, for the lynching of a Black person at this time. Whites who believed a white person should not be punished for attacking a Black man requested a retrial of Wood. Their request was denied, however, and Indiana governor James Whitcomb refused to involve himself in the case to pardon Wood.

The lynching of John Tucker had a strong impact on the Black community in Indianapolis. Many in the community began going out armed with clubs for protection. In the ensuing years, they faced not only the threat of racial violence, but increasingly discriminatory laws. The lynching had lasting effects even decades later, as Black men who could vote remembered the legal system's weak response to the Tucker case.

References 

Lynching Deaths in Indiana
1845 in Indiana
1845 deaths